New Jersey has over 4,100 MW of install solar power capacity as of mid-2022, which provides 6.7% of the state's electricity consumption. The's state's growth of solar power is aided by a renewable portfolio standard that requires that 22.5% of New Jersey's electricity come from renewable resources by 2021 and 50% by 2030, by incentives provided for generation of solar power, and by one of the most favorable net metering standards in the country, allowing customers of any size array to use net metering, although generation may not exceed annual demand. As of 2018, New Jersey has the sixth-largest installed solar capacity of all U.S. states and the largest installed solar capacity of the Northeastern States.

New Jersey has historically been aggressive in installing solar power, at one point being the second largest solar state in the U.S. with 306.1 megawatts of installed solar power in 2011, which was a 131% increase over the 132.4 megawatts installed in 2010. In 2010, New Jersey became the second state, after California, to install over 100 MW in a single year. The New Jersey Board of Public Utilities administers incentive programs that support the development of the state's solar industry. As of October 2022, over 166,000 solar photovoltaic systems have been installed, with 4,218 MW of capacity. Net-metered projects make up 80% of the installed capacity, 190 grid-supply projects make up 19% of capacity, and 20 community solar projects are 1% of capacity.

Incentives
The former New Jersey Clean Energy Program rebates on PV equipment have been discontinued.

The federal Residential Energy Efficient Property Credit (income tax credit on IRS Form 5695) for residential PV and solar thermal was extended in December 2015 to remain at 30% of system cost (parts and installation) for systems put into service by the end of 2019, then 26% until the end of 2020, and then 22% until the end of 2021. It applies to a taxpayer's principal and/or second residences, but not to a property that is rented out. There is no maximum cap on the credit, and the credit can be applied toward the Alternative Minimum Tax, and any excess credit (greater than that year's tax liability) can be rolled into the following year.

NJ law provides new solar power installations with exemptions from the 6.625% state sales tax, and from any increase in property assessment (local property tax increases), subject to certain registration requirements.

Renewable Portfolio Standard

New Jersey's renewable portfolio standard (RPS) is one of the most aggressive in the United States and requires each electricity supplier/provider to provide 22.5% from renewable energy sources by 2021. In addition, 2.12% must come from solar electricity, an amount estimated to be 1,500 megawatts (MW). Solar Renewable Energy Certificates (SRECs) must be purchased by electricity suppliers to meet the state targets or else they face a fine known as a Solar Alternative Compliance Payment (SACP) that was $0.691/kWh in 2010. As New Jersey was approaching the minimum requirements, the requirements were accelerated on July 23, 2012, changing the shape of the compliance curve from slowly increasing at first to rapidly increasing at first.

Solar Renewable Energy Certificates 

In 2004, New Jersey adopted a program promoting the use of Solar Renewable Energy Certificates (SRECs) to meet the solar energy carve-out of the state RPS. In the 2011 Energy Year, 306,000 SRECs (or MWhs of solar electricity) must be purchased by electricity suppliers in the state in order to meet the state solar requirement. That requirement grows to over 5 million in 2026.

An SREC program is an alternative to the feed-in tariff model popular in Europe. The key difference between the two models is the market-based mechanism that drives the value of the SRECs, and therefore the value of the subsidy for solar. In a feed-in tariff model, the government sets the value for the electricity produced by a solar facility. If the level is too high, too much solar power is built and the program is more costly. If the feed-in tariff is set too low, not enough solar power is built and the program is ineffective.

The SREC program allows for the creation of a certificate with every megawatt-hour (MWh) of electricity produced. The certificate represents the solar aspect of the electricity that is produced and can be unbundled and sold separately from the electricity itself. Electricity companies, known as load-serving entities, are required by state RPS laws to procure a certain amount of their electricity from solar. Since it is often more costly for them to build solar farms themselves, the load-serving entities will purchase SRECs from solar generators and use the SRECs to comply with the state laws. With an SREC market, the value of an SREC is determined by supply and demand, subject to certain limitations. If solar is slow to develop, SREC values will remain high, encouraging the development of solar. If too much solar is added, SREC values will decrease, which in turn lowers the attractiveness of the investment. The goal of an SREC market is to find the SREC price that effectively represents the difference between the cost of producing other electricity and the cost of producing solar electricity. As the cost of solar electricity comes down, so will the value needed for SRECs. SRECs in New Jersey have traded as high as $680 per MWh. In comparison, the average sale price for the electricity itself ranges from $50 per MWh to $180 per MWh. The value created from the benefits of selling SRECs dwarf the value created by the actual electricity produced in today's market. This means that SRECs play a major role in the return on investment for solar in New Jersey. In 2012 the program was modified in the "solar rescue bill" to increase the value of the SRECs, which have declined in value by 92% but cap them at no more than $325.

The SREC program closed to new registrations in April 2020. A total of 3,335 MW was installed under the SREC program.

The Transition Incentive Program was open to new registrations between October 2019 and August 27, 2021. This program provided fixed incentives called TRECs with different values for different project types. There was no limit to the number of projects that could apply. As of October 2022, 776 MW of projects have been completed under the TI Program.

The Successor Solar Incentive Program opened its Administratively Determined Incentive component on August 28, 2021. This program provides fixes incentives called SREC-IIs to up to 450 MW of small net-metered projects and community solar each year. As of October 2022, 106 MW of projects have been completed under the ADI Program.

The Competitive Solar Incentive component will begin in 2023 and provide SREC-IIs priced as part of a competitive solicitation to 300 MW of grid-supply and large net-metered projects each year.

Net metering

In 2008, New Jersey and Colorado were the only two states to allow unlimited net metering customers, up to 2 megawatts for each customer. In 2010 the limit was removed, and in 2012 connection may be to a 69 kV or lower line voltage, raising the previous requirements. New Jersey is one of three states which have no limit on an individual project's size, although generation may not exceed annual demand, and the Board of Public Utilities originally had the option of limiting participation to 2.5% of peak demand, but the cap was raised to 2.9% in August 2015, which was seen as a temporary fix that would cover three years. In 2018, the legislature increased the net metering cap to 5.8% of retail sales.

Landfill solar 
New Jersey's subsection (t) program, established in the Solar Act of 2012, has allowed for the redevelopment of numous landfill and brownfield sites into solar arrays. The Mount Olive Solar Farm, located on a former Superfund site, is the largest solar project on a landfill in North America and came online in November 2022. As of November 2022, there are more than 30 projects with over 275 MW of capacity built on closed and repurposed landfills and brownfields.

Solar 4 All project

In 2009, Public Service Enterprise Group, the largest utility company in New Jersey, announced plans to install solar panels on 200,000 utility poles in its service area, the largest such project in the world. In addition to 40 MW of pole mounted power, PSEG's Solar 4 All project built more than 28 solar projects with 45 MW. 40 MW is expected to come from customer installed projects.

Installed capacity

Generation

Beginning with the 2014 data year, the Energy Information Administration has estimated distributed solar photovoltaic generation and distributed solar photovoltaic capacity. These non-utility scale estimates project that New Jersey, generated the following additional solar energy.

Facilities
New Jersey also has the nation's largest floating solar array, an 8.9 MW project at New Jersey American Water's treatment plant in Millburn that was completed in 2022. The 4.4 MW system in Sayreville was the largest in the country when it was built in 2020.

See also

Wind power in New Jersey
List of power stations in New Jersey
Solar power in the United States
Renewable energy in the United States

References

External links

New Jersey's Clean Energy Program
Solar Activity Reports with installation data
New Jersey Board of Public Utilities
New Jersey Incentives/Policies for Renewables & Efficiency
PSEG
IRS Form 5695 - Residential Energy Credits and instructions
http://www.njspotlight.com/stories/17/02/07/nj-s-solar-stumble-sector-sheds-1-000-jobs-in-past-year/

 
New Jersey